Étienne "The Rock" Légaré (born March 15, 1984 in Saint-Raymond, Quebec) is a professional Canadian football defensive tackle who is currently a free agent. He was drafted by the Toronto Argonauts in the first round of the 2009 CFL Draft. He played CIS football for the Laval Rouge et Or. He was a two time Vanier Cup champion with Laval.

Early life
Born and raised in Laval, Légaré is the son of Martin and Lise Légaré and has two older brothers, Vincent and Dominic.

University career
In 2008 Légaré starred at Collège Laval and in that same year won the J.P Metras Trophy as the offensive lineman of the year. He was on two national championship teams with the Rogue et Or. Légaré graduated with a Physical Education major.

Professional career 
Upon being drafted second overall by the Argonauts on May 2, 2009, he was immediately signed to a three-year contract.

On October 12, 2010, Légaré was traded to the Eskimos for placekicker and punter, Noel Prefontaine. He also played for the Calgary Stampeders.

References

External links
Calgary Stampeders bio
Edmonton Eskimos player bio
Toronto Argonauts bio

1984 births
Living people
People from Saint-Raymond, Quebec
Canadian football defensive linemen
Edmonton Elks players
Laval Rouge et Or football players
People from Capitale-Nationale
Players of Canadian football from Quebec
Toronto Argonauts players